The various regional and minority languages in Europe encompass four categories:
 The language of a community in one single country, where the language community is not the linguistic majority, e.g. Sorbian in Germany, or Welsh in the United Kingdom
 The language of a community in two or more countries, in neither of which they are the linguistic majority, e.g. Basque in Spain and France, Sámi in Finland, Norway, Russia and Sweden 
 The language of a community who are a linguistic minority in one country, even though they are the majority in a different country, e.g. Danish in Germany, Finnish in Sweden, or Swedish in Finland 
 Languages without any fixed territory, that are traditionally spoken in one or more countries, but which cannot be assorted to one specific region, e.g. the languages of Sinti and Roma, the Yiddish language, the Yenish language as well as Plautdietsch

Dialects and languages of immigrants are not included in the official definition of the European Charter for Regional or Minority Languages.

The European Union regards Luxembourgish as a minority language, too, as it is not an official language of the EU. Through June 13, 2005, the Irish language also had this status.

In recent years, some countries of the EU have begun assorting the status as a minority language to various sign languages.

Countries with linguistic minorities

Albania 
 Aromanian
 Greek
 Macedonian
 Romani
 Serbian
 Turkish

Andorra 
 French
 Spanish

Austria 
 Burgenland Croatian in Burgenland 
 Yenish
 Romani
 Slovak in Vienna 
 Slovenian in Carinthia and Styria
 Czech in Vienna
 Hungarian in Burgenland and Vienna

Belarus 
 Latvian 
 Lithuanian
 Polish 
 Romani
 Rusyn
 Slovak
 Tatar
 Ukrainian

Belgium 
 French
 Walloon
 German
 Limburgish
 Luxembourgish
 Romani

Bosnia and Herzegovina 
 Romani
 Yiddish
 Turkish

Bulgaria 
 Armenian 
 Aromanian
 Macedonian
 Romani
 Romanian
 Russian
 Tatar
 Turkish

Croatia 
 Albanian
 Bosnian
 German
 Italian
 Istriot
 Istro-Romanian
 Romani
 Rusyn, also known as Ruthenian
 Serbian
 Slovak
 Czech 
 Hungarian

Cyprus 
 Armenian 
 Turkish
 Cypriot Arabic

Czech Republic 
 German
 Polish in the region near the border 
 Romani
 Slovak

Denmark 
 German (in Northern Schleswig)
 Romani
 Danish Sign language

Estonia 
 Russian
 Ukrainian
 Võro (Dialect of the South Estonian language)

Finland 
 Swedish (Finland Swedish), finlandssvenska
 Inari Sami, anarâškielâ
 Northern Sami, davvisámegiella
 Skolt Sami, sää´mkiõll
 Karelian (Livvi-Karelian language, livvinkarjala, and Karelian Karelian Proper - vienankarjala, suvikarjala and tverinkariela) 
 Finnish Romani, kaalengo tšimb/romano tšimb
 Finland-Swedish Sign Language
 Finnish Sign Language
 Mishar Tatar (language of the Finnish Tatars)

France 
 Franco-Provençal
 Basque
 Breton 
 German (Alsatian dialect and Lorraine Franconian)
 Italian
 Yenish
 Catalan
 Corsican 
 Dutch 
 Occitan
 Romani

Germany 
 Danish in Schleswig-Holstein
 Yenish
 Low German (incl. Plautdietsch)
 Low Franconian in North Rhine-Westphalia, incl. Limburgish and Kleverlander
 Central Franconian languages in North Rhine-Westphalia, incl. Ripuarian dialects
 Upper German in Bavaria and Baden-Württemberg, incl. Bavarian and Swabian
 North Frisian in Schleswig-Holstein
 Romani
 Saterland Frisian in Lower Saxony
 Sorbian in Lusatia, specifically:
 Upper Sorbian language in Upper Lusatia, in Saxony
 Lower Sorbian in Lower Lusatia, in Brandenburg

Greece 
 Arvanitika
 Aromanian
 Bulgarian
 Macedonian
 Megleno-Romanian
 Romani
 Judaeo-Spanish
 Turkish

Hungary 
 Armenian 
 Bulgarian
 German
 Greek
 Croatian
 Polish 
 Romani
 Romanian
 Rusyn
 Serbian
 Slovak
 Slovene
 Ukrainian

Ireland 
 Shelta
 Irish

Italy 
 Albanian
 German (regional official language in Trentino-Südtirol)
 various Highest Alemannic German and southern Bavarian dialects (e.g. the Cimbrian language)
 Franco-Provençal
 French (regionally an official language in Aosta Valley)
 Friulian
 Gallo-Italic languages
Piedmontese
Ligurian
Lombard
Western Lombard
Eastern Lombard
Emilian-Romagnol
Emilian dialect
Romagnol dialect
 Greek (also Griko in Calabria and Apulia)
 Catalan (in Alghero)
 Croatian
 Molise Slavonic
 Ladin (regionally an official language in Trentino-Südtirol; also insular occurrence in Province of Belluno)
 Occitan
 Sardinian
 Sicilian
 Slovenian (regionally an official language in Triest and Gorizia)
 Venetian
 Romani

Kazakhstan (European part) 
 Russian

Kosovo 
 Bosnian
 Gora
 Romani
 Turkish
 Serbian (second official language)

Latvia 
 Estonian
 Modern Hebrew
 Lithuanian
 Polish 
 Romani
 Russian
 Ukrainian
 Belarusian

Lithuania 
 Karaim
 Latvian 
 Polish 
 Romani
 Russian
 Tatar
 Ukrainian
 Belarusian

Moldova 
 Bulgarian
 Gagauz
 Russian
 Ukrainian

Montenegro 
 Albanian
 Bosnian
 Croatian
 Serbian
 Romani

Netherlands 
 Limburgish, related to Aachen Dialect in the German-speaking region of eastern Belgium and in Vaals / Kerkrade.
 West Low German
 Romani
 West Frisian
 Hindeloopen-Frisian
 Schiermonnikoog Frisian
 Westlauwers–Terschellings, including Terschelling Frisian and the most widespread Mainland West Frisian

North Macedonia 
 Albanian
 Aromanian
 Bosnian
 Megleno-Romanian
 Romani
 Serbian
 Turkish

Norway 
 Kven
 Lule Sami
 Northern Sami
 Southern Sámi

Poland 
 German, as an auxiliary language in a number of municipalities, mainly in Upper Silesia
 Kashubian, also known as Cassubian, in Kashubia, Pomeranian Voivodeship; the language is taught up to A-level 
 Yiddish language
 Lithuanian in the region bordering Lithuania 
 Romani
 Slovak in the region bordering Slovakia
 Tatar in the region bordering Belarus
 Czech in the region bordering the Czech Republic
 Ukrainian in the border area to Ukraine, as well as spoken by many immigrants
 Belarusian in the border area to Belarus

Portugal 
 Mirandese, around Miranda do Douro
 Lusitanic, by portuguese Sephardi Jews.
 Caló, by portuguese Romani

Romania 
 Aromanian
 Bulgarian
 German
 Yiddish
 Croatian
 Polish 
 Romani
 Rusyn
 Russian
 Serbian
 Slovak
 Tatarça 
 Czech 
 Turkish
 Ukrainian
 Hungarian

Russia (European part) 
 Armenian 
 Bashkir
 German
 Finnish
 Ingrian, also called Izhorian
 Kalmyk
 Karelian
 Ludic
 Livvi-Karelian, also called Southern Olonetsian
 Komi
 Komi-Permyak
 Komi-Zyryan
 Mari
 Hill-Mari
 Meadow-Mari
 Northwestern Mari
 Mordvinic
 Erzya
 Moksha
 Nenets
 Forest Nenets
 Tundra Nenets
 Romani
 Sami
 Kildin Sami
 Skolt Sami
 Ter Sami
 Tatar
 Chuvash
 Udmurt
 Ukrainian
 Belarusian
 Veps
 Votic

Serbia 
 Albanian
 Aromanian
 Bosnian
 Bulgarian
 German
 Croatian
 Macedonian 
 Romani
 Romanian
 Rusyn
 Slovak
 Czech 
 Turkish
 Hungarian

Slovakia 
 German
 Romani
 Rusyn
 Czech 
 Ukrainian
 Hungarian

Slovenia 
 Bosnian
 German
 Italian
 Croatian
 Romani
 Serbian
 Hungarian

Spain 
 Aragonese
 Aranese (= Occitan in France)
 Asturian
 Basque in Basque Country and Navarre
 Caló
 Galician in Galicia
 Catalan in Catalonia
 Valencian language 
 Balearic Catalan
 Leonese in Castile and León
 Quinqui, language of the Mercheros, a semi-nomadic group who live mainly in the northern half of Spain
 Romani

Sweden 
 Elfdalian
 Danish
 Finnish
 Gutnish 
 Jämtska, also called Jämtmål
 Yiddish
 Meänkieli, also called Torne Valley Finnish
 Romani
 Sámi languages, formerly also called Lappish (falling out of use; pejorative)

Switzerland 

 German (minority language in Bosco/Gurin and Ederswiler)
 French (official language)
 Sign languages:
 Swiss-German Sign language
 Swiss-French Sign language, recognized in Canton of Geneva
 Swiss-Italian Sign language
 Italian (official language)
 Lombard language, varieties in Grisons and Ticino
 Franco-Provençal
 Yenish, recognized as territorially unbound language
 Yiddish language, recognized minority language
 Rhaeto-Romance; Romansch official language in Grisons 
 Romani, language of the Sinti; Sinti recognized as national minority

Turkey 
 Adyghe, also known as West Circassian
 Arab
 Aramaic
 Armenian 
 Bosnian
 Georgian
 Greek
 Kurmanji
 Laz 
 Romani
 Zaza
 Azerbaijani
 Gagauz
 Crimean Tatar
 Tatar
 Turkmen
 Uygur

Ukraine 
 Bulgarian
 German
 Gagauz
 Yiddish
 Crimean Tatar
 Polish
 Romani
 Romanian
 Russian
 Rusyn
 Tatar
 Turkish
 Hungarian
 Belarusian

United Kingdom 
 Irish, as a regional official language in Northern Ireland
 Cornish, regional official language in Cornwall
 Scottish Gaelic, regional official language in Scotland
 Scots 
 Shelta
 Ulster Scots 
 Welsh, regional official language in Wales

British Crown Dependencies 
 Manx, regional official language of the Isle of Man
 Jèrriais, a Norman dialect spoken in Jersey and Sark, also known as Jersey Norman French
 Guernésiais, a dialect of Norman French spoken in Guernsey
 Sercquiais, a Norman dialect spoken in Sark

See also 

 Eurolinguistics

References

External links 

 Wiktionary minority language
 Sicherung von Regional- und Minderheitensprachen Languages of Europe (map and table of the languages spoken in Europe, by Urion Argador)

Concepts in language policy
Linguistic minorities